Domenico Santi, also known as il Mengazzino, (1621-1694) was an Italian painter, active in Modena, Mirandola, and Novellara, painting quadratura.

Biography
He was a pupil of Agostino Mitelli in Bologna. He moved to Mirandola in 1654. Among the pupils of Santi was Giacomo Alboresi,

References

17th-century Italian painters
Italian male painters
Italian Baroque painters
Quadratura painters
Painters from Bologna
1621 births
1694 deaths